Sau Mau Ping Memorial Park is a park located in Sau Mau Ping, Kwun Tong District, Kowloon, Hong Kong. The park was built on the hillside between Tsui Ping Road, Hiu Kwong Street and Hiu Ming Street, in memorial to the deceased of the disastrous flooding on 18 June 1972 (also known as June 18th flooding,), which took 71 lives when the hill slope adjacent to the park failed.

History
On 30 June 1972, the Land Development Planning Committee decided that the site of the landslide should be reserved for the construction of an open space to serve as a memorial rather than a school, for which the site had previously been earmarked. The collapsed slope was rebuilt with a gentler gradient and improved drainage infrastructure to ensure stability. The Urban Council originally planned to build a garden along with some recreational facilities on the site, including a badminton and basketball court. But owing to the gentler gradient, the reconstructed slope occupied more space than the previous one that collapsed and the recreational elements of the memorial were dropped in favour of a simpler garden. 

The park was completed in 1976. A stairway and pathway climbs the slope and links up with Hiu Kwong Street and a rest garden. A 560-square-metre section of land next to Kwun Tong Maryknoll College was added to the memorial park in the early 1980s.

Neighbouring locations
 Hong Kong Institute of Vocational Education
 Wo Lok Estate
 Po Pui Court
 Hiu Lai Court

See also
 History of Hong Kong

References

Sau Mau Ping
Urban public parks and gardens in Hong Kong